The 1988 Midwestern Collegiate Conference men's basketball tournament (now known as the Horizon League men's basketball tournament) was held March 10–12 at Market Square Arena in Indianapolis, Indiana.

Xavier defeated  in the championship game, 122–96, to win their third consecutive (fourth overall) MCC/Horizon League men's basketball tournament.

The Musketeers received an automatic bid to the 1988 NCAA tournament as the #11 seed in the Midwest region.

Format
All six conference members participated in the tournament and were seeded based on regular season conference records, with the top two teams (Xavier, Evansville) earning a bye into the semifinal round.

Bracket

References

Horizon League men's basketball tournament
Tournament
Midwestern City Conference men's basketball tournament
Midwestern City Conference men's basketball tournament